Byttneria ivorensis is a tree in the family Malvaceae that is now classified as extinct. It was identified from a single herbarium specimen collected in the Upper Guinean forests of Ivory Coast.

References

External links
 Holotype
 Isotype

ivorensis
Endemic flora of Ivory Coast
Extinct plants
Extinct biota of Africa
Plant extinctions since 1500
Taxonomy articles created by Polbot